is the second studio album by Japanese singer/songwriter Chisato Moritaka, released on March 25, 1988, by Warner Pioneer. In contrast to the city pop-oriented debut album New Season, Mi-ha is a mix of rock and pop tunes, with its tagline: . The album also marked Moritaka's songwriting debut with the title track.

The album peaked at No. 17 on Oricon's albums chart and sold over 72,000 copies.

Track listing 
All lyrics are written by Hiromasa Ijichi, except where indicated; all music is composed and arranged by Hideo Saitō, except where indicated.

Personnel 
 Chisato Moritaka – vocals, Fender Rhodes (A5), timbales (B4)
 Hideo Saitō – guitar, backing vocals, drum and synthesizer programming (all tracks except where indicated)
 Nobita Tsukada – keyboards, synthesizer programming (all tracks except where indicated)
 Ken Shima – keyboards, piano, backing vocals (A3, B5)
 Hatsuho Furukawa – keyboards (B3)
 Takayuki Negishi – synthesizer programming (A3, B5)
 Tomoaki Arima – synthesizer programming (A3, B3)
 Junro Satō – guitar (A3, B3)
 Chiharu Mikuzugi – bass (B3, B5)
 Reuben Tsujino – percussion (A1, B2)
 Shingo Kanno – congas (A1), güiro (A2), tambourine (B2)
 Jake H. Concepcion – tenor saxophone (A2–A3, B5)
 Misa Nakayama – backing vocals (A1, A2, B4)
 Nana – backing vocals (A3, B3)
 Takumi Yamamoto – backing vocals (B3)
 Yukari Fujio – backing vocals (A3, B3, B5)

Charts

Video album 

The video album for Mi-ha was released on CDV format on April 25, 1988.

Track listing

References

External links 
 
 
 

1988 albums
Chisato Moritaka albums
Japanese-language albums
Warner Music Japan albums